Seticosta cigcligrapha is a species of moth of the family Tortricidae. It is found in Napo Province, Ecuador.

The wingspan is 26 mm. The forewings are pale brownish, mixed with brownish red along the middle and with brown and whitish strigulae (fine streaks) and spots all over wing.

Etymology
The species name refers to the presence and form of creamy lines in the basal part of the forewing and is derived from Latin from Greek cigclis (meaning grate) and grapho (meaning to draw).

References

Moths described in 2004
Seticosta